Ballaban Badera (also known as Ballaban Pasha or Ballaban Badheri) was an Ottoman military officer from Albania. A conscript of the Devshirme system, he became a Pasha. Ballaban Badera was said to be the first climbing the walls of Constantinople. He held a position of sanjakbey of the Sanjak of Ohrid in 1464 and 1465.

Early life
Ballaban Badera was born in Mat, Albania as a Catholic with the name Michael, the son of Mark and Helena. Conscripted through the Devshirme system he rose to the rank of Pasha in the Ottoman Army under Sultan Mehmed II.

Ballaban fought Skanderbeg in April 1465 close to Ohrid. The Albanians were victorious, but many officers were captured, including Moisi Arianit Golemi of Dibra. They were sent to Constantinople, where they were executed in Istanbul for treason.

Two Janissaries
Mark had served in the army of the Wallachian Prince Mircea I, fighting against the Ottoman Turks. Michael, son of Mark and Helena, was kidnaped during the Ottoman Turkish raids. Ballaban Badera's mother, Helena, was killed during the Turkish raids Mark, father of Ballaban Badera, and brother Constantine escaped and survived the raids. Michael was raised as a Janissary and named Ballaban Badera, or Ballaban Pasha; he was a product of the Devshirme system, just as the entire troop of Janissaries was, and one of the best generals of the Ottoman Army under Sultan Mehmed II. Gjergj Kastrioti (Skanderbeg), with whom Ballaban Badera would cross paths of history, was raised as a Janissary as well, under the same Devshirme system Ballaban Badera was developed.

Ballaban and Skanderbeg
Ballaban fought Gjergj Kastrioti Skanderbeg in April 1465 close to Ohrid. The Albanians were victorious, but at a terrible cost: Ballaban Pasha showed his military prowess and thirteen highest ranking generals of Gjergj Kastrioti were captured; among them was Moisi Arianit Golemi of Dibra, Gjergj Kastrioti's, (Skanderbeg's), second in command. Moisi Arianit Golemi was the organizer of Skanderbeg's desertion from the Ottoman Court and subsequent return to Albania. Moisi Golemi was also the main political organizer and the heart and soul, if you will, of the Albanian Cause. Moisi Arianit Golemi, two of Gjergj Kastrioti's nephews, and the other captured generals were sent to Constantinople, modern day Istanbul. Gjergj Kastrioti offered great many captured Ottoman Pashas and great many Ottoman Prisoners, and enormous amounts of treasure in exchange for Moisi Golemi and the other generals, but Mehmet II refused: Moisi Golemi and the other captured Albanian Generals were all an invaluable prize to the Ottomans. Ballaban Badera had dealt a terrible blow to the Albanian resistance by capturing Moisi Golemi and high ranking Gjergj Kastrioti's generals, and the effect of that terrible blow was to be felt with time, after the death of Gjergj Kastrioti.

Ballaban and Moisi Arianit Golemi
As usual, Mehmet II made attempts to win alliances of the captured Albanian Generals against Skanderbeg, but such attempts failed. Moisi Arianit Golemi was not presented with such an offer: He had previously approached the Sultan, had betrayed Skanderbeg, and had led an Ottoman Army against Gjergj Kastrioti. In doing so, Moisi Golemi had hoped to save his people, and his country of Albania, from the utter devastation and the disastrous burden of the war against the Ottomans. Moisi Golemi calculated that it was better to accept Ottoman rule for a period in which the country could regain life and survive, so he decided to submit to the Ottomans and betray his Prince: Gjergj Kastrioti. Under Ottoman command, Moisi Golemi, who was a very astute strategist, and who was man of great wisdom and visionary, saw, experienced, and perfectly understood the futility of his submission to the Ottomans for the benefit of his people and his country. He deserted the Ottomans and returned to Gjergj Kastrioti. Eventually, Gjergj Kastrioti pardoned Moisi Golemi. But there was no clemency expected from Mehmet II, who was an astute strategist himself and understood what Moisi Golemi strived for. Mehmet II would seek searing vengeance for Moisi Golemi's apostasy. The stage is set and Moisi Arianit Golemi suffered an ignominious death, and so did all the other twelve captured Albanian Generals: They were all skinned alive publicly in Istanbul.

Ballaban's campaign (1465)

Ballaban's brother Constantine

Ballaban received further help from the Sultan and was sent leading Ottoman Armies against Skanderbeg once more, alongside an Albanian Pasha called Jakub Bej Arnauti, this time near Upper Dibra, in the Valley of Vaikal, but Ballaban, Jacub Bej Arnauti, and Ottoman Armies were again defeated. Jacub Bej Arnauti perished in that battle.

During all these historical endeavors, Constantine, son of Mark and Helena, brother of the boy Michael who had become Ballaban Badera, was a soldier under the command of Gjergj Kastrioti fighting against the Ottoman Armies led by his brother. Mark, father of the kidnapped boy Michael, was also a soldier under Gjergj Kastrioti's command. Mark identified with Skanderbegs cause and became sworn brothers ("vllam" a widespread practice among Albanians at the time) with Muzak Stresi, the Lord of Shkodër. Mark would go ahead and foster Morsinia, the Albanian Heiress of Muzak‘s realm, daughter of Muzak Stresi and Mara Cernoviche who were murdered by Hamza Kastrioti, the infamous nephew of Gjergj Kastrioti (Skanderbeg).

Hamëz Kastrioti had appropriated the vast estates of the Stresi and had birth claims over the estates of the Kastrioti‘s; Ballaban Badera saw the opportunity and organized the coronation of Hamëz Kastrioti as King of Albania, under vassalage of the Ottomans. Gjergj Kastrioti (Skanderbeg) learned of the plans and gives the order that it must be stopped at any cost and all of Albania must take up arms. The Battle of Albulena ensued and Hamëz Kastrioti was captured.

Ballban Badera later came as a commanding general of the army under Mehmet II during the Second Siege of Krujë (1466), where he kept the city besieged for just under a year. In that battle, Ballaban Badera was killed by an arquebus shot to the neck by Gjergj Aleksi, a defender of the city and a hunter in his civilian life. After Ballaban's death, the Ottoman Army stationed in Albania lost its unity and was soon defeated.

Notes

References
 
 

1460s deaths
15th-century Albanian people
Albanians from the Ottoman Empire
Ottoman military personnel killed in action
Year of birth unknown
People from Mat (municipality)
Albanian Pashas
Janissaries